Belleville High School is a public high school located in Belleville, Michigan and the only zoned high school in the Van Buren School District.

History 
In 1953, a fire destroyed the third floor of Belleville High School. The blaze began in a basement store room and swept to the second and third floors via a nearby ventilating shaft. No one was injured, but the second and third floors were damaged beyond use for the rest of the school year.  The third floor had remained closed, and before the demolition of the building  classes continued on the first and second stories.

During the Winter of 2010, the Van Buren Public Schools Board of Education approved the accelerated schedule that the architect of Fanning Howey and Granger Construction presented. The new Belleville High School was built just east of the location where the old Belleville High School stood. The new school was completed in the Summer of 2012 and school was in session for the first time (at the new school) on September 4, 2012. The class of 2013 will be the first to graduate from the new school.

As of August 2012, the old Belleville High School was demolished, excluding the music wing, auditorium, and cafeteria.

WBHS Channel 19 
In 2000, Comcast set the school up with an educational access station which would come to be called WBHS Channel 19. The station is almost entirely run by students taking the year-long "Channel 19" course with only the aid of one instructor and the occasional alumni volunteer. The station broadcasts the daily produced morning announcements, student projects, Semi-annual live telethons and other events from around the area which are either taped by the high school's T.E.C. Club or submitted by parents & staff. The station itself is shown on channel 19 as well as HD channel 902 in Comcast's Van Buren Township Corp, 9502.

Athletics
Belleville's team rivals are the Lincoln High School Railsplitters and the Romulus High School Eagles.

Notable alumni 
Billy Ashley, Los Angeles Dodgers, Boston Red Sox
Juan Atkins, Belleville Three musician
Ian Gold, Denver Broncos linebacker
Arlington Hambright, football player
Cullen Jenkins, Green Bay Packers defensive end
Kris Jenkins, New York Jets defensive tackle
Myra MacPherson (1952) journalist and writer
Derrick May, Belleville Three musician
Frank Nunley, linebacker for the San Francisco 49ers
Kevin Saunderson, Belleville Three musician
Keith Simons, Kansas City Chiefs defensive tackle
Gabe Brown, Toronto Raptors forward

References

External links 
 VBPS Main Page
 School's Educational Access Website
 School website

Educational institutions established in 1869
Public high schools in Michigan
Schools in Wayne County, Michigan
1869 establishments in Michigan